Alpha 1-antichymotrypsin (symbol α1AC, A1AC, or a1ACT) is an alpha globulin glycoprotein that is a member of the serpin superfamily.  In humans, it is encoded by the SERPINA3 gene.

Function 

Alpha 1-antichymotrypsin inhibits the activity of certain enzymes called proteases, such as cathepsin G that is found in neutrophils, and chymases found in mast cells, by cleaving them into a different shape or conformation.  This activity protects some tissues, such as the lower respiratory tract, from damage caused by proteolytic enzymes.

This protein is produced in the liver, and is an acute phase protein that is induced during inflammation.

Clinical significance 

Deficiency of this protein has been associated with liver disease. Mutations have been identified in patients with Parkinson disease and chronic obstructive pulmonary disease.

Alpha 1-antichymotrypsin is also associated with the pathogenesis of Alzheimer's disease as it enhances the formation of amyloid-fibrils in this disease.

Interactions

Alpha 1-antichymotrypsin has been shown to interact with DNAJC1.

See also
 Alpha-1 antitrypsin, another serpin that is analogous for protecting the body from excessive effects of its own inflammatory proteases

References

Further reading

External links
 The MEROPS online database for peptidases and their inhibitors: I04.002
 
 
 

Acute-phase proteins